The Yaquina people were a tribe of Native Americans. There were 19 Yaquina in 1910. Their language was one of the Yakonan languages. The Yaquina lived around the Yaquina River and Yaquina Bay, both of which have been named after it. The town of Yaquina, Oregon, has also been named after the Indians.

Villages

North of Yaquina River
Yaquina villages north of the Yaquina River were:

 Holukhik
 Hunkkhwitik
 Iwai
 Khaishuk
 Khilukh
 Kunnupiyu
 Kwulaishauik
 Kyaukuhu
 Kyuwatkal
 Mipshuntik
 Mittsulstik
 Shash
 Thlalkhaiuntik
 Thlekakhaik
 Tkhakiyu
 Tshkitshiauk
 Tthilkitik
 Ukhwaiksh
 Yahal
 Yikkhaich

South side of Yaquina River
Yaquina villages south of the Yaquina River were:

 Atshuk
 Chulithltiyu
 Hakkyaiwal
 Hathletukhish
 Hitshinsuwit
 Hiwaitthe
 Kaku
 Khaiyukkhai
 Khitalaitthe
 Kholkh
 Khulhanshtauk
 Kilauutuksh
 Kumsukwum
 Kutshuwitthe
 Kwaitshi
 Kwilaishauk
 Kwulchichicheshk
 Kwullaish
 Kwullakhtauik
 Kwutichuntthe
 Mulshintik
 Naaish
 Paiinkhwutthu
 Pikiiltthe
 Pkhulluwaaitthe
 Pkuuniukhtauk
 Puuntthiwaun
 Shilkhotshi
 Shupauk
 Thlekwiyauik
 Thlelkhus
 Thlinaitshtik
 Thlukwiutshthu
 Tkulmashaauk
 Tuhaushuwitthe
 Tulshk

References

Native American tribes in Oregon
Confederated Tribes of Siletz Indians
Kalapuya
Newport, Oregon
Alsean languages